Ese Odo is a Local Government Area in Ondo State, Nigeria, populated by the Ijaw (Izon) ethnic sub groups of the Western Apoi tribe and the Arogbo tribe. Its headquarters are in the town of Igbekebo. The biggest towns within this Local Government Area are Arogbo, Igbobini, Agadagba-Obon, and Igbekebo.

It has an area of 762 km and a population of 154,978 at the 2006 census.

The postal code of the area is 352.

References

2. https://nigeriazipcodes.com/5965/list-of-towns-and-villages-in-ese-odo-lga/. Retrieved 2019-12-16.

Local Government Areas in Ondo State